Herpf is a part (Stadtteil) of the town of Meiningen in the district Schmalkalden-Meiningen, in Thuringia, Germany. It was an independent municipality until 1 December 2010, when it was merged into Meiningen.

References

Former municipalities in Thuringia
Meiningen